Chukwudi "Chidi" Imoh (born 27 August 1965) is a former sprinter from Nigeria who won an Olympic silver medal in the 4 x 100 metres relay at the 1992 Summer Olympics. He also won a silver medal in the 100 metres at the 1986 Goodwill Games, finished behind Ben Johnson and ahead of Carl Lewis. He won a 60 metres bronze medal at the 1991 World Indoor Championships, and he became African champion in 1984 and 1985.

In 1986 he posted the world leading time for that year in the 100 metres.

He won the 100 metres race in the 1987 All-Africa Games.

Imoh is also a former runner for the University of Missouri in Columbia. He holds the records there in the 200 m outdoor with a time of 19.9, the 100 m outdoor with a time of 10.00 and in the 55 m indoor with a time of 6.10.

Personal bests
 100 metres - 10.00 (1986)
 200 metres - 21.04 (1985)

References

External links
 
 
 

1963 births
Living people
Nigerian male sprinters
Doping cases in athletics
Nigerian sportspeople in doping cases
Athletes (track and field) at the 1984 Summer Olympics
Athletes (track and field) at the 1988 Summer Olympics
Athletes (track and field) at the 1992 Summer Olympics
Olympic athletes of Nigeria
Olympic silver medalists for Nigeria
Medalists at the 1992 Summer Olympics
World Athletics Championships athletes for Nigeria
World Athletics Indoor Championships medalists
Igbo sportspeople
Missouri Tigers men's track and field athletes
Olympic silver medalists in athletics (track and field)
African Games gold medalists for Nigeria
African Games medalists in athletics (track and field)
Universiade medalists in athletics (track and field)
Goodwill Games medalists in athletics
Athletes (track and field) at the 1987 All-Africa Games
Universiade gold medalists for Nigeria
Medalists at the 1983 Summer Universiade
Medalists at the 1985 Summer Universiade
Competitors at the 1986 Goodwill Games